Shin Yea-ji may refer to:

 Shin Yea-ji (figure skater born 1988), South Korean figure skater
 Shin Yea-ji (figure skater born 1984), South Korean figure skater

See also
Shin (Korean surname)
Ye-ji (name), Korean feminine given name